The qualifying rounds for the 1995 US Open were played in late August 1995 at the USTA National Tennis Center in Flushing Meadows, New York City, United States.

This event marks the only participation of Marcelo Ríos (who eventually became world No. 1 in singles in 1998) at a doubles competition of any Grand Slam tournament. Ríos teamed up with Sjeng Schalken, losing in the final round against Roger Smith and Paul Wekesa. The pair would also win an ATP tournament in Amsterdam at the same year, which would be the only title of Ríos in his entire doubles career.

Seeds

Qualifiers

Lucky losers
  Stefan Kruger /  Christo van Rensburg

Qualifying draw

First qualifier

Second qualifier

Third qualifier

Fourth qualifier

References

External links
 Official results archive (ATP)
1995 US Open – Men's draws and results at the International Tennis Federation

Men's Doubles Qualifying
US Open (tennis) by year – Qualifying